Hash Jar Tempo is a collaborative musical project between the members of Philadelphia-based psychedelic band Bardo Pond and experimental guitarist and composer Roy Montgomery. The band was founded in March 1995 and have released two albums, Well Oiled and Under Glass, and have never toured.

History
In 1995, Montgomery was introduced to the members of Bardo Pond, who were already familiar with Roy Montgomery's Dadamah project. On March 26, members of Bardo Pond and Montgomery entered the studio and recorded a  completely improvised session. The improvised pieces from that session would be released two years later as Well Oiled under the name Hash Jar Tempo, which is a pun on the band Ash Ra Tempel. When Montgomery returned to the States, the band reunited and recorded another improvised session on April 27, 1998, this time with Isobel's participation. The band released the music on their final album Under Glass the following year.

Band members
Former members
 Joe Culver – drums (1995, 1998)
 John Gibbons – guitar (1995, 1998)
 Michael Gibbons – guitar (1995, 1998)
 Roy Montgomery – guitar (1995, 1998)
 Isobel Sollenberger – flute (1998)
 Clint Takeda – bass guitar (1995, 1998)

Discography
Studio albums
Well Oiled (Drunken Fish, 1997)
Under Glass (Drunken Fish, 1999)

References

External links

American post-rock groups
Free improvisation ensembles
Musical groups from Philadelphia
American psychedelic rock music groups
Drunken Fish Records artists
Musical groups established in 1995
Musical groups disestablished in 1995
Musical groups reestablished in 1998
Musical groups disestablished in 1998